Fogo Island may refer to:

 Fogo Island (Newfoundland and Labrador), the largest of Newfoundland's offshore islands, in Canada
 Fogo Island, Newfoundland and Labrador, a settlement on the island
 Fogo, Cape Verde

See also 
 Fire Island (disambiguation)
 Isla del Fuego